Constance Ama Emefa Edjeani-Afenu ( Edjeani;
born 1959 or 1960 ― died 24 January 2022) was the first female brigadier general of the Ghana Armed Forces.  

She was deployed to several United Nations peacekeeping missions, and served as the Deputy Military Adviser to Ghana's permanent Mission in New York City.

Early life
Edjeani-Afenu's father was in the army, as were her two siblings who predeceased her. She  grew up in Tamale, and attended Kamina Barracks Primary and  Armed Forces Experimental in Kumasi before studying for O- and A-levels at Wesley Girls' Senior High School in Cape Coast.

Career 
The sixth-born of ten siblings,  Edjeani-Afenu entered the Ghanaian Armed Forces in 1978, at age 18. She was one of only two female students in her intake, and the other woman left the course after a few weeks. Edjeani-Afenu was commissioned on 25 April 1980 as a Second Lieutenant after 18 months of training at Ghana Military Academy. In the early 1990s, she was at the Junior Division of the Armed Forces Command and Staff College, She later joined the Forces Pay Regiment as a commanding officer in 1999.

In February 1999,  the then Major Edjeani-Afenu was appointed the Commanding Officer of the Forces Pay Office, making her the first female Commanding Officer of a Unit in the Ghana Armed Forces. 

She was appointed to serve as the Deputy Military Adviser of the Permanent Mission in the New York from 2013 to 2016. It was also the first time a woman had occupied that position.

As part of Ghana Battalion, she was deployed to UNIFIL in 1994 and 1998, MONUSCO in 2007, and UNMIL in 2009.

On 7 March 2016, Edjeani-Afenu was promoted to the rank of Brigadier General, the highest position ever occupied by a female in the Armed Forces.

The UN appointed her as the Deputy Force Commander in MINURSO in 2019.

Achievements 

During Edjeani-Afenu's training, she was appointed a Cadet Sergeant which was notably reserved for male recruits. She earned the Determination and Perseverance Trophy in her graduating class, Ghana Armed Forces.

In February 1999,  Major-General Edjeani-Afenu was appointed the Commanding Officer of the Forces Pay Office, making her the first female Commanding Officer of a Unit in the Ghana Armed Forces.

In March 2017, she was conferred on as a Brigadier-General of the Armed Forces. This made her the first female to get top rank in GAF. 

She was named the African Union (A.U.) Gender champion for 2017 by the president of Ghana, Nana Akufo-Addo.  She received the "First Lady's Award" on International Women's Day in 2019 from Rebecca Akufo-Addo.

She was posthumously awarded Major General title therefore making her the first Ghanaian Female to attain such position.

Personal life and death 
Edjeani married Fred Afenu, an army officer; they had three children.

She died after a brief illness on 24 January 2022, according to Ghana Armed Forces officials.

References 

Date of birth missing
Year of birth uncertain
20th-century births
2022 deaths
Ghana Army personnel
Brigadier generals
Female military personnel
African women in war
People from Tamale, Ghana